This is a list of Panjabi films of 1973.

List of films

External links 
 Punjabi films at the Internet Movie Database

1973
Punjabi